Derek Pepperell (born 28 September 1968) was an English cricketer. He was a left-handed batsman and wicket-keeper who played for Dorset. He was born in Oxford.

Pepperell played for Hampshire and Sussex Second XIs between 1989 and 1990. Pepperell made a single List A appearance for Dorset in the 1992 NatWest Trophy. As an opening batsman, he scored 6 runs before being caught out, failing to emulate the form of batting partner Graeme Calway, who scored the only century of his career.

External links
Derek Pepperell at Cricket Archive 

1968 births
Living people
English cricketers
Dorset cricketers
Cricketers from Oxford